Northern Vietnam Helicopter Company (VNH North), formerly the Northern Service Flight Company (Northern SFC) is a Vietnam People's Army-owned chartered airline in Vietnam. It is one of the two airlines operated by the Vietnam Helicopter Corporation. The airlines provides helicopter services for tourism as well as oil and gas exploration and VIP transportation. The company is based in Gia Lam airport, Hanoi.

Fleet
 Mil Mi-17
 Mil Mi-172
 Mil Mi-8
 EC 155

References

External links
 https://web.archive.org/web/20100830015818/http://www.northernsfc.vn/

Airlines of Vietnam
Helicopter airlines